KVTU-LD, virtual and VHF digital channel 3, was a low-power Azteca Corazón-affiliated television station serving Los Angeles, California, United States that was licensed to Agoura Hills. The station was owned by DTV America.

History 
The station signed on the air in 2004 as an owned-and-operated translator of the Trinity Broadcasting Network, relaying the signal from TBN flagship KTBN-TV of Santa Ana. In 2010, TBN took the station silent.

In 2015, DTV America purchased the station.

On October 29, 2020, KVTU-LD's license was canceled by the Federal Communications Commission due to the station having been silent for more than twelve months.

Subchannels
The station's digital signal was multiplexed:

References

External links

 

Innovate Corp.
Low-power television stations in the United States
VTU-LD
Television channels and stations established in 2004
Television channels and stations disestablished in 2020
2004 establishments in California
2020 disestablishments in California
Defunct television stations in the United States